Babingtonia grandiflora, commonly known as the large flowered babingtonia, is a shrub endemic to Western Australia.

It is found in the Mid West and Wheatbelt regions of Western Australia between Northampton and Gingin.

References

Eudicots of Western Australia
grandiflora
Endemic flora of Western Australia
Plants described in 2015